Ervin Taha (born 14 March 1999) is a French professional footballer who plays as forward for Nancy.

Club career
Taha developed through the Girondins de Bordeaux academy. He made his Ligue 1 debut for the club on 28 November 2017 against Saint-Étienne coming on for Jonathan Cafú in the 81st minute of a 3–0 home win.

In June 2019 Taha joined the reserves of Guingamp. After making three Ligue 2 appearances for the club, he signed a three-year professional contract with Guingamp on 29 May 2020.

On 27 November 2020, Taha joined Laval on loan until the end of the 2020–21 season, in order to get playing time.

On 1 February 2022, Taha moved on loan to Créteil.

International career
Born in France, Taha is of Ivorian descent. He is a youth international for France.

References

External links
 
 
 En Avant Guingamp profile

1999 births
Living people
Footballers from Paris
Association football forwards
French footballers
French sportspeople of Ivorian descent
France youth international footballers
Championnat National 2 players
Championnat National 3 players
Ligue 1 players
Ligue 2 players
Championnat National players
FC Girondins de Bordeaux players
En Avant Guingamp players
Stade Lavallois players
US Créteil-Lusitanos players
AS Nancy Lorraine players